Iason Abramashvili (born 26 April 1988) is a Georgian alpine skier from Bakuriani. He competed for Georgia at the 2010 Winter Olympics in the slalom and giant slalom. Abramashvili was Georgia's flag bearer during the 2010 Winter Olympics opening ceremony. After the death of fellow Georgian athlete Nodar Kumaritashvili, who was also from Bakuriani, he initially considered withdrawing, but decided to stay in Vancouver to compete in honor of his fallen comrade.

References

1988 births
Living people
Alpine skiers at the 2006 Winter Olympics
Alpine skiers at the 2010 Winter Olympics
Alpine skiers at the 2014 Winter Olympics
Alpine skiers at the 2018 Winter Olympics
Male alpine skiers from Georgia (country)
Olympic alpine skiers of Georgia (country)
People from Samtskhe–Javakheti